The R170 Mercedes-Benz SLK-Class is the first generation of the Mercedes-Benz SLK-Class range of compact luxury roadsters produced by Mercedes-Benz between 1996 and 2004. 

SLK stands for the company’s design mission to create a sportlich (sporty), leicht (light) and kurz (compact) roadster, and is based on a shortened platform of the W202 Mercedes C-Class.

It was replaced by the Mercedes R171 SLK in 2004.

Development and launch 
The R170 Mercedes SLK is based on the SLK I Concept and SLK II Concept, which is a two-seater roadster concept car that features a folding metal electro-hydraulic roof, dubbed 'vario-roof' by Mercedes, and takes 25 seconds to operate. A German design patent was filed on 30 September 1993, with the final production version of the SLK introduced at the Turin Motor Show on 22 April 1996.

The R170 SLK is based on the W202 C-Class platform, sharing many drivetrain and chassis components, as well as using a shortened version of the floor pan.

The platform of the R170 Mercedes SLK is also used by the Chrysler Crossfire, which shares 80% of its components with the car.

Equipment 
Standard equipment includes power seats, power windows, power steering, dual-zone climate control,  dimmable interior mirror, and alloy wheels. Safety features include front and side driver and passenger airbags, anti-lock brakes, and electronic stability control. Models could also be optioned with the AMG body design package, that features body colour side skirts, chromed tailpipes, and 17-inch AMG alloy wheels. Wider wheels were also available on SLK 230 Kompressor models.

Models

SLK 200, SLK 200 Kompressor 
The SLK 200 was exported and sold exclusively to Italy, Netherlands, Portugal, Turkey, and Greece, and was only available with the Getrag five-speed manual transmission in most countries. After the 2000 facelift, the SLK 200 Kompressor was introduced to the worldwide market, replacing the SLK 200.

Engines

SLK 32 AMG 

The SLK 32 AMG was introduced in 2001, designed to rival the BMW M Roadster and Porsche Boxster S. The car featured the same M112 engine as in the SLK 320, but has a helical twin-screw supercharger and water-to-air intercooler.

The SLK 32 AMG introduced Mercedes’ new ‘SpeedShift’ 5G-Tronic (automatic) transmission, that allow for manual shifting of the gears, and faster automatic downshifts before overtaking. There was no manual transmission option available for the SLK 32 AMG.

SLK 32 production started from January 2001, to March 2004. A total of 4,333 were produced; 979 were sold in Germany, 2,056 were imported to the US, and 263 to the UK.

Model year changes

1998 
 Passenger airbag will now automatically deactivate if Mercedes-branded child seat is fitted

1999 
 Storage net, automatic-dimming rear view mirrors, and vehicle motion sensing alarm added
 Introduction of Manual transmission and AMG Sport package options, which included Sport aero body kit, 17" staggered AMG wheels, HD sway bars, and performance exhaust

2000 facelift 

Production for facelift models began after February 2000. Major changes include:

 Exterior design changes including: redesigned front and rear bumpers, a redesigned silver grille and taillights, body-colour painted side-skirts and door handles, integrated indicators in wing mirrors, and stainless steel trim in the exhaust
 Interior design changes including: a restyled steering wheel and transmission shifter, and more supportive sports seats
 SLK 230 Kompressor engine updated, SLK 320 introduced, and SLK 200 Kompressor replaces SLK 200 and now introduced for worldwide market
 Electronic stability control upgraded

2001 
 Six-speed manual transmission introduced, replacing the existing five-speed manual transmission
 SLK 32 AMG high performance variant introduced

Safety

Production volumes 
The following are production figures for the R170 SLK:

Awards 
 The R170 Mercedes SLK was on Car and Driver's Ten Best list for 1997.
 Named ‘North American Car of the Year’ for 1997.

References

Bibliography

 
 
 
 
 
 
 
 
 

R170
R170
2000s cars
Cars introduced in 1996
Roadsters